The  Philadelphia Eagles season was the franchise's 7th season in the National Football League. The team failed to improve on their previous output of 5–6, winning only one game. The team failed to qualify for the playoffs for the seventh consecutive season. The October 22 game against Brooklyn was the first NFL game to be televised.

Off Season 
The Eagle moved their training camp to St. Joseph's University in Philadelphia, Pennsylvania.

NFL Draft 
The 1939 NFL Draft had 22 rounds and was held on December 9, 1938.

The Eagles drafted in the 4th spot in the 20 rounds they had picks. They chose a total 20 players, of which 9 made the team for the 1939 season.

The Chicago Cardinals choose Charles "Ki" Aldrich as a center that went to Texas Christian. The TCU Horned Frogs had 3 players in the top 7 picks in the first round

Player selections 

The table shows the Eagles selections and what picks they had that were traded away and the team that ended up with that pick. It is possible the Eagles' pick ended up with this team via another team that the Eagles made a trade with.
Not shown are acquired picks that the Eagles traded away.

Regular season

Schedule

Standings

Playoffs 
The Eagles had a 1–9–1 record and failed to make it to the 1939 NFL Championship Game. The game was on December 10, 1939, at Wisconsin State Fair Park in West Allis near Milwaukee, Wisconsin. This was the seventh NFL championship game played. The Green Bay Packers defeated the New York Giants to win their fifth title. The game attendance was 32,379.

The game matched the champions of the Eastern Division, New York Giants (9–1–1) against the Western Division champion Green Bay Packers (9–2–0). The Packers won 27–0 in a rematch of the 1938 NFL Championship Game that was won by the Giants.

Roster 
(All time List of Philadelphia Eagles players in franchise history)

As was in 1937 roster and 1938 roster, this year team is mostly rookies and players with 1 or 2 years NFL experience.

Awards and honors 
 Davey O'Brien finishes 2nd in pass attempts with 210
 Davey O'Brien finishes 2nd in pass completions with 99
 Davey O'Brien leads NFL in passing yards with 1324
 Joe Carter named to Pro All_Star team.
 Davey O'Brien named to Pro All-Star team.

References 

Philadelphia Eagles seasons
Philadelphia Eagles
Philadelphia Eag